Genrikh Aleksandrovich Fedosov (6 December 1932 – 20 December 2005) was a Soviet football player.

Honours
 Soviet Top League winner: 1954, 1955, 1957, 1959.

International career
Fedosov made his debut for USSR on 24 November 1957 in a 1958 FIFA World Cup qualifier against Poland and scored on his debut. He was selected for the final tournament squad, but did not play in any games there.

External links
  Profile

1932 births
People from Velikiye Luki
2005 deaths
Russian footballers
Soviet footballers
Association football forwards
Soviet Union international footballers
Soviet Top League players
FC Dynamo Moscow players
FC Dynamo Kirov players
FC Shinnik Yaroslavl players
1958 FIFA World Cup players
Sportspeople from Pskov Oblast
FC Zvezda Perm players